USS Argonne may refer to one of two United States Navy vessels:

 , built in 1916 at Kobe, Japan, by the Kawasaki Dockyards.
 , originally designated AP-4 and commissioned 8 November 1921.

References 
 

United States Navy ship names